Back Door to Hell is a 1964 Filipino-American war film concerning a three-man team of United States soldiers preparing the way for Gen. MacArthur's World War II return to the Philippines by destroying a Japanese communications center. It was produced on a relatively small budget and received lukewarm reviews.

John Hackett wrote the script on the boat from the US to the Philippines. Jack Nicholson was writing the script to Flight to Fury at the same time.

Hellman, Nicholson and Hackett also made the film back to back with Flight to Fury (1964).

Plot
Three American servicemen land in the Philippines and request the aid of a group of guerillas in the fight against the Japanese. The Japanese secret police learn of this and hold the children of the village hostage, threatening to kill one of them every hour until the Americans are handed over, but the Americans and guerilla fighters rescue the children and capture some Japanese prisoners after a difficult battle. When Lt. Craig hesitates and does not shoot two escaping Japanese, Jersey says that he is cracking under pressure. The Americans unsuccessfully interrogate the prisoners for information about beach defenses and troop movements but Paco, leader of the guerillas, successfully obtains the information through torture. Lt. Craig is distraught that the prisoners are then executed by the guerillas.

The bandit leader Ramundo offers information about Japanese positions and movements in exchange for the Americans' radio. When the Americans are unable to give it to him immediately because they still need it to send information about the Japanese positions and movements, Ramundo angrily shoots the radio and flees. The Americans sneak into a Japanese shortwave station but Burnett is killed after transmitting the information through Morse code. Paco provides cover fire so that Jersey can carry Burnett's body away but then Paco is shot and killed as well. Ships of American troops arrive to fight the Japanese but Lt. Craig and Jersey sorrowfully remember the dead along with Maria and the other guerillas.

Cast 
 Jimmie Rodgers as Lt. Craig
 Jack Nicholson as Burnett
 John Hackett as Jersey
 Annabelle Huggins as Maria
 Conrad Maga as Paco
 Johnny Monteiro as Ramundo
 Joe Sison as Japanese Capt.
 Henry Duval as Garde
 Ben Perez
 Vic Uematsu

Production
Robert Lippert had been impressed by Jack Nicholson's Thunder Island so gave Nicholson and his friends Monte Hellman and John Hackett $160,000 and $400 a week salary to make two films on location in the Philippines. The three men and Hellman's wife and child travelled 28 days by ship via Hawaii, Hong Kong and Japan with the three working on the screenplays to both films on the voyage.  Back Door to Hell was a rewrite on one of Lippert's existing screenplays.

Popular singer Jimmie Rodgers had a substantial part in the film, and co-financed it.

The film, directed by Monte Hellman, was shot on location in the Philippines, giving it a particularly authentic look. The same plot was reused in Ib Melchior's Ambush Bay (1966) with a larger Marine patrol destroying a minefield prior to the American and Filipino invasion of the Philippines.

Notes

External links 
 
 
 
 
 original film trailer https://www.youtube.com/watch?v=MhwQG--b_Uk

1964 films
American black-and-white films
Pacific War films
Films directed by Monte Hellman
Films set in 1944
Films set in the Philippines
Japanese occupation of the Philippines films
Films shot in the Philippines
Japan in non-Japanese culture
1960s English-language films